Richard Žemlička (born 13 April 1964) is a Czech former professional ice hockey left winger.

Playing career
Žemlicka began his career with HC Slavia Praha and HC Sparta Praha, becoming a regular member of Sparta's roster in 1987. He was drafted 185th in the 1990 NHL Entry Draft by the Edmonton Oilers but never made the move to North America and remained with Sparta Praha before moving to the SM-liiga in Finland for TPS during the 1991-92 season. He then moved to Germany in 1992 to play in the Eishockey-Bundesliga and later the Deutsche Eishockey Liga for EHC Freiburg, Eisbären Berlin and ESG Sachsen Weißwasser before returning to Sparta Praha in 1995.

Žemlicka stayed with Sparta for the next eight seasons, becoming the team's captain in 2001. In 2003, he joined HC Litvínov and in 2004, he moved to the Slovak Extraliga for spells with HK Poprad and MHK 32 Liptovský Mikuláš. From 2006 until his retirement in 2010, Žemlicka played for HC Roudnice nad Labem.

Žemlicka was a member of the Czechoslovakia national team and later the Czech Republic national team following the split of Czechoslovakia in 1993. He played at the 1992 Winter Olympics and helped Czechoslovakia win the bronze medal. He also played in the 1994 Winter Olympics for the Czech Republic.

Career statistics

Regular season and playoffs

International

References

External links
 
 

1964 births
Living people
Czech ice hockey left wingers
Czechoslovak ice hockey left wingers
Edmonton Oilers draft picks
EHC Freiburg players
Eisbären Berlin players
HC Litvínov players
HC Slavia Praha players
HC Sparta Praha players
HC TPS players
HK Poprad players
Lausitzer Füchse players
MHk 32 Liptovský Mikuláš players
Olympic bronze medalists for Czechoslovakia
Olympic ice hockey players of Czechoslovakia
Olympic ice hockey players of the Czech Republic
Olympic medalists in ice hockey
Ice hockey players at the 1992 Winter Olympics
Ice hockey players at the 1994 Winter Olympics
Medalists at the 1992 Winter Olympics
Ice hockey people from Prague
Czechoslovak expatriate sportspeople in Finland
Czechoslovak expatriate ice hockey people
Czech expatriate ice hockey players in Germany
Czech expatriate ice hockey players in Slovakia